William Richards (11 March 1878 – 1947) was an English footballer who played in the Football League for Bury. Richards played in both the 1900 and 1903 FA Cup Finals.

References

1878 births
1947 deaths
English footballers
Association football forwards
English Football League players
Bury F.C. players
FA Cup Final players